Fís Nua (English: "New Vision") is a minor environmentalist political party in Ireland.

History
The party was formed in June 2010, mainly by former members of the Green Party who were unhappy with that party's participation in the then coalition government with Fianna Fáil. Fís Nua intended to campaign on the issues of political transparency, environmental issues and social justice, and hoped to draw support from existing supporters of both the Greens and the Labour Party. "Fís Nua" means "New Vision" in Irish.

The party was registered on 4 February 2011, and on the following day it was announced that they would run six candidates in the 2011 general election. Subsequently that same month the party clashed with a rival group which had also adopted the name "New Vision". This group was formed by a son of former Fianna Fail Minister Neil Blaney as an umbrella group for independent politicians based on four pillars: separation of bank debt and sovereign debt; overhaul of the public service; a strategy to create jobs; and what they call "the restructure" of the state's energy resources. Neither group changed their name but the latter appeared to have disappeared from public life shortly after its founding.

The party previously had one town councillor in Wicklow, Pat Kavanagh, who was elected as a member of the Green Party, but quit that party and ran in the 2011 election as a Fís Nua candidate. She then became an Independent politician.

In 2016, one of the party's two candidates in that year's general election, Niamh Ó Brien, was convicted and sentenced to four months imprisonment on charges of dangerous driving and failure to provide an intoxicant sample, after refusing to produce documentation after being stopped by Garda patrol which led to the injury of one officer who believed her to be under the influence of cannabis.

In November 2017, the Standards in Public Office Commission stated that no statements of accounts had been received from the Fís Nua, in breach of the Electoral Act.

Fís Nua has not contested any elections since 2016, though as of March 2022, it remains a registered political party. It's official Facebook account has, as of 2022, not made any posts since 2019. Some of the final posts by the account included posts encouraging users to support far-right conspiracy theorist Gemma O'Doherty, a post informing users that the party did not have the funds required to contest the 2019 European Parliament election in Ireland and instead encouraged them to spoil their votes, and finally another post discussed the possibility of the party merging with the right-wing populist group Direct Democracy Ireland.

Electoral history

2011

General election
The party ran five candidates in the 2011 general election: one each in Dublin Central, Dublin South-East and Waterford and two in Wicklow. At the press launch on 5 February the party announced that it would also contest Cork South-West but their candidate failed to be nominated by the deadline of 9 February.

Although registered on 4 February 2011, the party's name did not appear on the ballot, as the Register of Political Parties in use was that in force on 1 February when the writ for the general election was issued.

All candidates polled less than 5% of the vote. Peadar Ó Ceallaigh, the candidate in Dublin South-East, polled the lowest first preference vote of all the candidates in the election, and the second-lowest on record.

Dublin West by-election
The party contested the Dublin West by-election held in October 2011. This was the first election at which the party's name appeared on the ballot paper. The party's candidate, Peadar Ó Ceallaigh, came last of the 13 candidates, securing 40 votes or 0.1% of the total first preferences.

2014
The party had candidates in each of the three constituencies for European Parliament elections, the Dublin West by-election for a seat in Dáil Éireann and also a number of candidates for local elections: all elections were held on Friday 23 May 2014.

Dublin West by-election
The party's candidate was Daniel Boyne. He received 113 first preference votes, this being 0.4% of the votes cast; he was last of the ten candidates and was eliminated after the first count.

European Parliament

Local Elections

2016 general election
The party ran two candidates in the general election held on 26 February 2016. They were Niamh Ó Brien in Clare and Cordelia Nic Fhearraigh in Donegal. O'Brien came thirteenth of sixteen candidates, receiving 1,154 first preference votes, and was eliminated on the second count. Nic Fhearraigh came last of the sixteen candidates in Donegal, receiving 70 first preference votes, and was eliminated on the first count. Nic Fhearraigh, who made all her election communications exclusively through the Irish language, was one of the lowest-polling candidates in the country.

References

External links

2010 establishments in Ireland
Green parties in Europe
Left-wing politics in Ireland
Political parties established in 2010
Political parties in the Republic of Ireland